Carmen Bernand (born Carmen Muñoz on 19 September 1939) is a French anthropologist, historian and Latin Americanist.

Biography 
Carmen Bernand was born in France to Spanish refugee parents, she lived in Argentina for 25 years, where she studied Ethnology at University of Buenos Aires. At the end of 1964, she moved to Paris and prepared a postgraduate thesis under the direction of Claude Lévi-Strauss. In 1966, she married the epigraphist  (1923–2013).

Bernand is a specialist in the history of New World and Latin America, she conducted field surveys of Andean populations in Argentina, Peru and Ecuador. Since the late 1980s, she has devoted herself to the historical anthropology of Latin America.

She teaches at the Paris Nanterre University and is a member of the Institut Universitaire de France.

She also wrote in Spanish a crime novel set in Inca Empire.

Selected publications 

 Co-author with Serge Gruzinski, De l’idolâtrie : Une archéologie des sciences religieuses, collection « Philosophie Générale ». Seuil, 1988
 Les Incas : Peuple du Soleil, collection « Découvertes Gallimard » (nº 37), série Histoire. Éditions Gallimard, 1988 (new edition in 2010)
 US edition – The Incas: People of the Sun, “Abrams Discoveries” series. Harry N. Abrams, 1994
 UK edition – The Incas: Empire of Blood and Gold, ‘New Horizons’ series. Thames & Hudson, 1994
 Co-author with Serge Gruzinski, Histoire du Nouveau Monde (2 volumes), Fayard, 1991 and 1993
 Historia de Buenos Aires, Fondo de Cultura Económica USA, 1999
 Un Inca platonicien : Garcilaso de la Vega 1539–1616, Fayard, 2006
 Co-author with Catherine Escrive, Viracocha, le père du Soleil inca, Éditions Larousse, 2008
 Cuzco, le nombril du monde, Éditions de La Flandonnière, 2010

References 

1939 births
Living people
Incan scholars
French anthropologists
French women anthropologists
20th-century French historians
French essayists
French women novelists
French women historians
Historians of South America
French people of Spanish descent
21st-century French historians
University of Buenos Aires alumni
Academic staff of Paris Nanterre University